Senso is the debut studio album by Australian singer-songwriter Stephen Cummings, released in 1984. The album spawned the singles "We All Make Mistakes", "Stuck on Love", "Backstabbers", "Gymnasium", and "Another Kick in the Head". It peaked at number 46 on the Australian Kent Music Report. The album was re-released on CD in 1992. In 2007, the album was re-reissued with This Wonderful Life.

Reception
Toby Crewel from Rolling Stone Australia gave the album 4 1/2 out of 5, saying "Senso is superficially a collection of romance songs slanted towards the slower numbers. However with repeated listenings it becomes much more than that – it's one of those rare records which reveals new depths and new delights with each spin." adding "Lyrically the songs move from melancholic rapture to ecstatic reverie with paranoia, viciousness and quiet determination in there somewhere as well. Cummings delivers them with more confidence than he showed on The Sports records and he seems especially comfortable with the strong female harmonies and duets. His phrasing has never been better, his voice is more mature and his control more supple. He still loves to twist words out of shape and squeeze nuance from his vocal melody but he rarely mangles the lyric as has happened in the past."

Track listings

1992 reissue

2007 reissue

Charts

Release history

Personnel 
 Arranged by (brass arrangements) – Greg Flood
 Joe Creighton - Bass, Additional vocals
 Mark Ferry - Bass
 Vince Jones - Cornet (solo)
 Martin Armiger - Drum programming (Drumulator), Guitar, Keyboards
 Peter Luscombe - Drums
 Andrew Pendlebury - Guitar
 Robert Goodge - Guitar
 Duncan Veal - Keyboards
 Jantra de Vilda - Keyboards
 Stephen Bigger - Keyboards
 Ricky Fataar -  Percussion
 Wilbur Wilde - Saxophone Solo on Walking Out The Door
 Joe Camilleri - Saxophone Solo on Another Kick in the Head
 Venetta Fields - Additional vocals
 Nick Smith - Additional vocals
 Linda Nutter - Additional vocals
 Nick Smith - Additional vocals
 Stephanie Sproul - Additional vocals

References 

1984 debut albums
Stephen Cummings albums
Albums produced by Martin Armiger
Regular Records albums
Warner Music Group albums